Ambiguity is uncertainty as to intended meaning. It is the quality of being open to more than one interpretation; inexactness.

Ambiguity  also may refer to:
Ambiguity (album)
Ambiguity (horse), 20th-cen. racer 
Ambiguity (law), contract law situation 
Ambiguous name, botanical taxonomy 
 
situation

See also 
Ambiguity aversion,  decision theory concept
Volatility, uncertainty, complexity and ambiguity
Word-sense disambiguation
Disambiguation (disambiguation)